

References

Sports venues in Derbyshire
King George V Playing Fields, List of
Derbyshire
Lists of buildings and structures in Derbyshire